Al-Nabi Yunus Mosque was a historic mosque located in Mosul, Iraq. It contained a tomb believed to be that of the Biblical prophet Jonah, known as Yunus by Muslims.

History 
The alleged grave of the Prophet Yunus was discovered by Jalal al-Din Ibrahim al-Khatni during his reconstruction of the site as a congregational mosque in 1365. However, the mosque was also built over a demolished Assyrian Christian church that marked Jonah's grave.

In 1924, the minaret was added to the mosque building by a Turkish architect. During Saddam Hussein's rule, the mosque was renovated and expanded.

Construction 
The mosque has one minaret and a conical ribbed dome. The floors of the mosque are built out of Alabaster and the prayer rooms have arched entrances that are inscribed with Quranic verses.

The alleged tomb of Jonah is located at a corner of the mosque. The sarcophagus believed to be that of Jonah has a wooden zarih built around it.

In addition to Jonah's tomb, a modern shrine which contains the tomb of Shaykh Rashid Lolan is present next to the mosque. This shrine dates back to the 1960s.

2014 destruction 
On 24 July 2014, the building was blown up by the Islamic State of Iraq and the Levant, damaging several nearby houses. They stated that "the mosque had become a place for apostasy, not prayer."

Archeological discovery 
In March 2017, after ISIL was driven out, a system of tunnels about one kilometre long were found under the mosque. Although all moveable items had been removed, there were still Assyrian reliefs, structures and carvings along the walls.

References 

14th-century mosques
Mosques completed in the 1360s
Buildings and structures destroyed by ISIL
Destroyed mosques
Mosques in Mosul
Sunni Islam in Asia
Sunni mosques in Iraq
Buildings and structures demolished in 2014
Attacks on mosques in Asia
Islamist attacks on mosques